Clifford Victor Johnson (born 5 March 1968) is a British theoretical physicist and professor at the University of Southern California Department of Physics and Astronomy.

Biography
Johnson lived in Montserrat for 10 years. Johnson's research focus is in superstring theory and particle physics, specifically related to strongly coupled phenomena. He has previously worked at the Kavli Institute for Theoretical Physics at the University of California, Santa Barbara, the Institute for Advanced Study, Durham University and Princeton University. He received the 2005 Maxwell Medal and Prize from the Institute of Physics, "For his outstanding contribution to string theory, quantum gravity and its interface with strongly coupled field theory, in particular for his work on understanding the censorship of singularities and the thermodynamic properties of quantum spacetime." He received a National Science Foundation CAREER Award in 1997. In 2005, the Journal of Blacks in Higher Education listed Clifford Johnson as the most highly cited black professor of mathematics or a related field at an American university or college. He was named a Fellow of the American Physical Society in 2021.

He graduated with a Bachelor of Science in Physics from Imperial College London in 1989 and he completed his Doctor of Philosophy in Mathematics and Physics from the University of Southampton in 1992.

He also actively works to promote science in the public and physics outreach. As part of this effort, he regularly appears on the History Channel series The Universe and acts as a science consultant for the Discovery Channel. Johnson founded the African Summer Theory Institute, "which brings teachers, researchers, and students of all levels together for a month-long conference on a science topic—a different one every year—to discuss, to network, and, of course, to learn."

He has also served as a science consultant for science fiction films and television shows including Avengers: Endgame and Star Trek: Discovery. He made a brief cameo appearance in the 2020 film Palm Springs. In 2023 he was a guest on The Life Scientific on BBC Radio 4.

Bibliography

References

External links
 His faculty page at University of Southern California
 Clifford Johnson (homepage)
 Asymptotia
 African Summer Theory Institute

1968 births
Alumni of Imperial College London
Alumni of the University of Southampton
Living people
British string theorists
English physicists
University of Southern California faculty
Theoretical physicists
Maxwell Medal and Prize recipients
Black British academics
Fellows of the American Physical Society